Der Kongress tanzt (English: The Congress Dances) is a German musical comedy film produced in 1931 by Ufa, directed by Erik Charell, starring Lilian Harvey as Christel Weinzinger, the glove seller, Willy Fritsch as Tsar Alexander I of Russia and his doppelgänger, Uralsky, Otto Wallburg as Bibikoff, his Adjutant, Conrad Veidt as Prince Metternich, Carl-Heinz Schroth as his Secretary, Pepi, Lil Dagover as the Countess and Alfred Abel as the King of Saxony.

Der Kongress tanzt is a particularly well achieved move in Ufa's attempt to challenge US supremacy in the European film arena, taking advantage of the introduction of sound. As such, the studio released the movie in three different language versions (MLV): in German, in French as Le congrès s'amuse, and English as Congress Dances. Lilian Harvey played in all three versions, as she spoke all languages; Henri Garat replaced Willy Fritsch for the French and English versions.

Ufa spared no efforts: the cast reads like a who's who of German film, from the top billers of the day to heavy-weight comedians - even the supporting cast is made out of stars. The sets were lavish and top talent made up the entire technical cast.

Despite the ambition and the auspicious beginning, Ufa's challenge to US supremacy never materialized, both due to the strength of the Hollywood majors and to the constraints Germany's creative film and performers would suffer from 1933 onwards.

"This truffle of cinema unfolds its flavours like a heavenly feast for the anonymous millions it is dedicated to." Lichtbild-Bühne.

Plot

Der Kongress tanzt takes place during the Congress of Vienna, that took place in 1814/1815 after the Napoleonic Wars, a meeting between the powers that was to set the frontiers of the world.

Russia's Tsar Alexander is traveling incognito among the people in the tradition of his ancestor Peter the Great, coming across a witty and charming Viennese glove seller, the young Christel Weinzinger. She announces her business by throwing flowers with a visiting card into each carriage that drives past. As the story unfolds, Christel is accused of an assassination attempt and finally condemned. The punishment is however waived and Christel is again free.

The Tsar, having fallen in love with Christel, uses the visiting card, in order to visit her in her business. A romance develops, with Prince Metternich and his army of spies intending to use the situation to further his own agenda. This however clashes with Pepi, his secretary, who is also in love with Christel. Christel tells her friends about the romance, which is naturally not believed. Only as the Tsar arrives with a splendid carriage to fetch her, does astonishment set in.

The romance is terminated when Napoléon Bonaparte escapes from the island of Elba and marches upon Paris. The Tsar, as all other rulers, has to leave. Christel stays behind, miserable, but finds solace with Pepi.

Cast
German version
Lilian Harvey as Christel Weinzinger
Willy Fritsch as Czar Alexander of Russia
Otto Wallburg as Bibikoff
Conrad Veidt as Prince Metternich
Carl-Heinz Schroth as Pepi
Lil Dagover as The Countess
Adele Sandrock as The Princess
Margarete Kupfer as The Countess
Julius Falkenstein as The Minister of Finance
Max Gülstorff as The Burgermeister
Paul Horbiger as Heurigen Singer
Boris Romanoff as Dancer
Ernst Stahl-Nachbaur as Napoleon

English version

Lilian Harvey as Christel
Conrad Veidt as Prince Metternich
Henri Garat as Czar Alexander I / Uralsky
Lil Dagover as Countess
Gibb McLaughlin as Bibikoff
Reginald Purdell as Pepi
Philipp Manning as King of Saxony
Humberston Wright as Duke of Wellington
Helen Haye as Princess
Spencer Trevor as Finance Minister
Tarquini d'Or as Heurige Singer

French version
Lilian Harvey as Christel Weizinger
Lil Dagover as The Countess
Henri Garat as Alexander Uralsky
Armand Bernard as Bibikoff
Pierre Magnier as Metternich
Odette Talazac as The Princess
Robert Arnoux as Pepi
Sinoel as Finance Minister
Jean Dax as Talleyrand
Paul Ollivier as Le Maire de Vienne
Tarquini d'Or as Heurige Singer

Reception 
The Japanese filmmaker Akira Kurosawa cited this movie as one of his 100 favorite films.

References 

Movies of the 30s edited by Jürgen Müller, Taschen.

External links 
 
 

1931 films
1931 musical comedy films
1931 romantic comedy films
1930s historical comedy films
German musical comedy films
German romantic comedy films
German historical comedy films
Films of the Weimar Republic
1930s German-language films
German black-and-white films
German multilingual films
Operetta films
Films set in the 1810s
Films set in Vienna
UFA GmbH films
Films directed by Erik Charell
Films produced by Erich Pommer
Balls (dance party) in films
Depictions of Napoleon on film
Cultural depictions of Klemens von Metternich
German historical romance films
1931 multilingual films
1930s historical musical films
German historical musical films
Films set in the Austrian Empire
Congress of Vienna
1930s German films